Operation Trident, or simply Trident, is a Metropolitan Police Service unit, originally set up in 1998 for the Black community, as a community led initiative with the police to tackle gun crime and homicide disproportionately affecting African-Caribbean communities, following a series of shootings in the London boroughs of Lambeth and Brent. By 2008 the unit was responsible for investigating all non-fatal shootings for the Metropolitan Police, and in February 2012 the unit's remit was again expanded: the new Trident Gang Crime Command was launched, incorporating responsibility for tackling wider gang crime. In 2013 the unit gave up responsibility for investigating fatal shootings, which was taken over by the Homicide and Serious Crime Command.

Trident is currently led by Detective Chief Superintendent Dean Haydon, who joined the team from the Counter Terrorism Command in 2012.

The perceived importance of Trident's mission was such that it was established as a dedicated Operational Command Unit, called the Trident Operational Command Unit, within the Metropolitan Police Specialist Crime Directorate.

The campaign uses gun amnesties and advertisements encouraging people to phone Crimestoppers with information related to gun crime. These advertisements appear in the media, nightclubs, on petrol pumps, telephone boxes, and on the radio. As part of Specialist Crime and Operations Directorate, Trident is also known as SC&O8.

As the timeline of the police unit and program has roughly paralleled the development and growth of the rap-styled UK Grime urban music scene, Trident and Grime have had numerous and varied interactions that have mirrored early controversy and conflict around American Gangsta Rap.  While some artists like Giggs have spoken out against what they claim is heavy-handed censorship and attempts to sabotage their careers by applying pressure to venue owners, radio stations, and record labels, others like the Roll Deep Crew have worked with Trident to create anti-violence messaging packaged in ways more likely to reach marginalized urban youth. Prominent artist JME, particularly known for his conscious lyrics which are dismissive of content that relies on excessively violent hyperbole, released a short film via VICE Magazine, entitled "The Police vs Grime Music", investigating the legal details of the phenomenon of police suppression of grime events.

In 2006, Trident officers raided the home of vintage gun enthusiast Mick Shepherd, seizing much of his collection. At the time, press reports claimed a "huge gun-smuggling racket" had been uncovered, and that guns sold by Shepherd were linked to a number of murders. After being held in Pentonville and then the high-security Belmarsh prisons on remand for 10 months awaiting trial, Shepherd was acquitted of all 13 firearms offences with which he was charged.

See also
 Crime in London
 Yardie
 Specialist Crime Directorate
 Death of Mark Duggan

References

External links
 Claudia Webbe Resigns as Chair of IAG
 .
 Stop the guns
 .
 .
 .
 .
 .
 .
 
 .
 .

Firearm laws
Trident
Metropolitan Police units
Organised crime in London